Williams F1 Team Driver, also known as Hot Wheels: Williams F1 Team Driver or Hot Wheels: F1 Racer, is a racing video game developed by KnowWonder and published by THQ in late 2001. In this game, player advance in the ranks from driving go karts to Formula 1600cc, Formula 3, and finally onto Formula One, to allow the player to follow the career path of real F1 driver. The game includes 16 international tracks, as well as a custom track builder.

References 

2001 video games
2002 video games
Amaze Entertainment games
Formula One video games
Racing video games
Single-player video games
THQ games
Video games developed in the United States
Windows games
Windows-only games